David Guez was the defending champion, but lost in the first round to first seeded Édouard Roger-Vasselin.
Igor Sijsling won the final 6–3, 6–4 against Malek Jaziri.

Seeds

Draw

Finals

Top half

Bottom half

References
 Main Draw
 Qualifying Draw

Open BNP Paribas Banque de Bretagne - Singles
2012 Singles